Pilar, officially the Municipality of Pilar,  is a 5th class municipality in the province of Cebu, Philippines. According to the 2020 census, it has a population of 12,506 people.

The municipality is contiguous with Ponson Island, one of the four Camotes Islands in the Camotes Sea (along with Pacijan Island, Poro Island, and Tulang Island).

Geography

Barangays
Pilar comprises 13 barangays:

Climate

Demographics

Language
People in Pilar mainly speak Cebuano with an accent similar to the locals of Bohol. Like most Filipinos, Pilaranons may also speak Tagalog and English. Waray is also spoken due to its proximity to Leyte.

The town is home to the Porohanon language, one of the most endangered languages in the Visayas. The language is only used in the Poro islands. The language is classified as distinct from Sebwano (Bisaya) by the Komisyon ng Wikang Filipino and is vital to the culture and arts of the Porohanon people.

Economy

References

External links
 [ Philippine Standard Geographic Code]

Municipalities of Cebu
Island municipalities in the Philippines
Islands of Cebu